Carlos Fernando Navarro Montoya (born 26 February 1966) is a retired footballer who played as a goalkeeper. Born in Colombia, Navarro Montoya represented the Colombia national team three times, and gained Argentine citizenship later in his career.

During a professional career which spanned 25 years, he represented teams in Argentina, Colombia, Spain, Chile, Brazil and Uruguay, appearing for 15 clubs (mainly Boca Juniors) and totalling more than 800 games across all competitions.

Club career
Nicknamed El Mono (monkey) whilst in Argentina, Navarro Montoya was born in Medellín, Colombia, and he started playing professionally in the former country at only 18, with Club Atlético Vélez Sarsfield. In 1988, after one year in his homeland with Independiente Santa Fe, he joined Boca Juniors, where he would rarely miss a game in nearly ten years – never played in fewer than 35 matches in his full seasons – also setting club records of consecutive games (180) and minutes without conceding a goal (824), and eventually appearing in 396 official games for the Xeneizes. His last appearance, however, ended in defeat, 1–3 at Club Atlético Banfield.

In January 1997, aged almost 31, Montoya joined CF Extremadura in La Liga, suffering relegation with that and his following two teams, CP Mérida and CD Tenerife, also in the first division. After a brief spell in Chile with Club Deportes Concepción, he returned to Argentina and played top-flight football for Chacarita Juniors, Club Atlético Independiente (after the promotion of youngster Óscar Ustari, the 39-year-old did not see his contract renewed) and Club de Gimnasia y Esgrima La Plata, during five seasons combined.

Montoya rarely settled with a team in the following years, playing in his country of adoption but also in Brazil and Uruguay. On 10 July 2009, at the age of 43, he announced his retirement from professional football, stating: "It is 'goodbye', but also 'thank you'".

International career
As a naturalized Argentine, Navarro wanted to represent its national team, but was denied from doing so by FIFA because he had already played for Colombia in three 1986 FIFA World Cup qualifiers – two against the same opponent, Paraguay – conceding four goals.

In 1998 FIFA relented and allowed the player a special dispensation to play for Argentina but, at the age of 32, he was considered too old and never represented his adopted nation.

Coaching career
Montoya's first managerial experience was in Chacarita Juniors, from where he was sacked after only one win in six matches.

In December 2013 he returned to Boca Juniors, this time as deputy director of the youth divisions and youth coach. He covered several roles, until he left his position on 16 September 2020. On 23 September 2020 he took over the Club Deportivo Guadalajara of the Tercera División in Spain, but was dismissed on 24 November after only five league games.

Honours

Club
Boca Juniors
Primera División (1): 1992 Apertura
Supercopa Sudamericana (1): 1989
Recopa Sudamericana (1): 1990
Copa Master de Supercopa (1): 1992 
Copa de Oro (1): 1993

Individual
Player of the Year of Argentina: 1994

References

External links

 Argentine League statistics at Fútbol XXI 
 
 

1966 births
Living people
Footballers from Medellín
Colombian footballers
Colombia international footballers
Colombian people of Argentine descent
Sportspeople of Argentine descent
Citizens of Argentina through descent
Argentine footballers
Colombian emigrants to Argentina
Argentine people of Colombian descent
Sportspeople of Colombian descent
Association football goalkeepers
Argentine Primera División players
Club Atlético Vélez Sarsfield footballers
Boca Juniors footballers
Chacarita Juniors footballers
Club Atlético Independiente footballers
Club de Gimnasia y Esgrima La Plata footballers
Categoría Primera A players
Independiente Santa Fe footballers
La Liga players
Segunda División players
CF Extremadura footballers
CP Mérida footballers
CD Tenerife players
Nueva Chicago footballers
Olimpo footballers
Tacuarembó F.C. players
Chilean Primera División players
Deportes Concepción (Chile) footballers
Campeonato Brasileiro Série A players
Club Athletico Paranaense players
Colombian expatriate footballers
Argentine expatriate footballers
Expatriate footballers in Spain
Expatriate footballers in Chile
Expatriate footballers in Brazil
Expatriate footballers in Uruguay
Colombian expatriate sportspeople in Spain
Argentine expatriate sportspeople in Spain
Colombian expatriate sportspeople in Chile
Argentine expatriate sportspeople in Chile
Colombian football managers
Argentine football managers
Chacarita Juniors managers
CD Guadalajara (Spain) managers